Santino Fontana is an American actor and singer. He has received a Tony Award, two Drama Desk Awards, an Outer Critics Circle Award, Lortel Award, Obie Award, and Clarence Derwent Award in a mix of straight plays and musicals. A two-time Tony Award nominee and three-time Drama Desk Award nominee, Fontana won the 2019 Tony Award for Best Actor in a Leading Role in a Musical, Drama Desk Award for Outstanding Actor in a Leading Role in a Musical, and Outer Critics Circle Award for his lead performance as Michael Dorsey in the stage adaptation of Tootsie.

Fontana is known to film audiences as the voice of Prince Hans in Disney's 2013 animated film Frozen.

Fontana has appeared on television as Greg Serrano on seasons 1 and 2 of Crazy Ex-Girlfriend and David Saperstein in Shades of Blue with Jennifer Lopez and Ray Liotta.

Early life and education 
Fontana was born in Stockton, California, to Sharon Marie Fontana (née Simarro; born 1951) and Ernest John Fontana (born 1948). His mother is an elementary school teacher and his father is an agronomist. He has one sister. He is of one quarter Spanish, one quarter Portuguese, and one half Italian descent. Fontana graduated from Richland High School in Richland, Washington.  Fontana studied the arts at the Academy of Children's Theatre in his youth, located in Richland, Washington. As a teenager he studied Theatre Arts at Interlochen Arts Camp at Interlochen Center for the Arts. He is a graduate of the University of Minnesota/Guthrie Theater BFA Actor Training Program.

Acting career 

In 2005, as a member of the Essentials, Fontana co-wrote the musical comedy Perfect Harmony, and originated the role of Philip Fellowes V. In 2006, he starred as Hamlet in The Guthrie Theatre's performance of the Shakespearean classic, before moving to New York City to star as Matt in the Off-Broadway revival of The Fantasticks. His Broadway debut was Sunday in the Park with George in 2007. Fontana originated the role of Tony in the Broadway production of Billy Elliot from October 1, 2008, to July 4, 2009. He was awarded the 2010 Drama Desk Award for Best Featured Actor in a Play for his work in Brighton Beach Memoirs. He starred as Prince Topher in Rodgers & Hammerstein's Cinderella on Broadway, for which he was nominated for a Tony Award for Best Leading Actor in a Musical.

In 2013, he provided the voice of Prince Hans in the Walt Disney Animation Studios film Frozen.

In 2015, Fontana became the first guest artist to perform three times in the space of one year with the Tabernacle Choir on Temple Square where he met the cast of Sesame Street. Fontana also joined the cast of the CW romantic musical comedy-drama Crazy Ex-Girlfriend that same year. On November 11, 2016, it was announced that Fontana was leaving the TV series after his one-year contract with the CW.

He starred as Michael Dorsey / Dorothy Michaels in the stage musical adaptation of the film Tootsie, which premiered in Chicago at the Cadillac Palace Theatre from September 11 to October 14, 2018. The musical opened on Broadway on April 23, 2019, and closed on January 5, 2020. Direction was by Scott Ellis with music and lyrics by David Yazbek and book by Robert Horn. Fontana won the Tony Award for Best Actor in a Musical for the production.

In 2022, Fontana co-starred in the Hallmark Channel film Just One Kiss with actress Krysta Rodriguez.

Personal life 
Fontana began dating actress Jessica Hershberg in mid-2011. The couple met backstage at the Birdland jazz club, where both were performing. They became engaged in September 2014 and married in September 2015.

Theatre credits

Broadway

Other theatre

Filmography

Film

Television/web series

Discography

Audiobooks

Awards and nominations

References

External links
 
 
 
 Santino Fontana biography for The Neil Simon Plays
 Off Off Broadway Online interview, 2006
 A new prince takes the 'Hamlet' throne MNDaily.com, 2006
 "Who Knew? Hamlet graduated from CLA" on page 9, Reach magazine, College of Liberal Arts, University of Minnesota
 Santino Fontana's thread on Friends of Billy Elliot

1982 births
American male stage actors
Drama Desk Award winners
Living people
University of Minnesota College of Liberal Arts alumni
21st-century American male actors
21st-century American singers
21st-century American male singers
Male actors from California
People from Richland, Washington
Male actors from Washington (state)
People from Stockton, California
American baritones
American male film actors
American male musical theatre actors
American male voice actors
American people of Italian descent
American people of Portuguese descent
American people of Spanish descent
American male television actors
American male web series actors
Audiobook narrators
Tony Award winners